A Single Spark (lit. "A Beautiful Youth, Jeon Tae-il") is a 1995 South Korean drama film directed by Park Kwang-su.

Plot
A biographical film about Jeon Tae-il, a worker who protested labor conditions through self-immolation.

Awards
 Blue Dragon Film Awards (1995) Won Best Film Award
 46th Berlin International Film Festival (1996) Nominated for Golden Bear (Park Kwang-su)

References

Bibliography
 
 
 
 

1995 films
Best Picture Blue Dragon Film Award winners
1990s Korean-language films
South Korean drama films
Films directed by Park Kwang-su
1995 drama films